Khlong Phadung Krung Kasem is a canal (khlong) in Bangkok. It was dug in 1851 in order to serve as a new outer moat for the expanding city, extending its boundaries from the Rattanakosin Island to the north and east.

History
When the city of Rattanakosin (the formal name of the capital city today known as Bangkok) was founded by King Phutthayotfa Chulalok (Rama I) in 1782, it was set within fortified walls, and Khlong Rop Krung was constructed as a moat to protect the city's eastern flank. The Chao Phraya River formed a natural barrier to the west. By the time of King Mongkut (Rama IV)'s reign, the city had outgrown its original area, and in 1851 the King ordered the digging of another canal, roughly parallel to the old moat, from Wat Thewarat Kunchon to Wat Kaeo Fa. The construction, headed  by Chaophraya Si Suriyawong, was completed the following year, and the King named the canal Khlong Phadung Krung Kasem, roughly meaning "the canal upholding the city's happiness". As the political climate and military practices had vastly changed by then, defensive walls were no longer deemed necessary, although seven forts were nevertheless built along the canal (plus one on the western bank opposite the canal's mouth).

Gallery

See also
History of Bangkok
Fortifications of Bangkok

References

Phadung Krung Kasem, Khlong
History of Bangkok
Registered ancient monuments in Bangkok